Kleinebach (also: Kleine Bach) is a small river of North Rhine-Westphalia, Germany. It flows into the Rhedaer Bach near Halle (Westfalen).

See also

List of rivers of North Rhine-Westphalia

Rivers of North Rhine-Westphalia
Rivers of Germany